Milan "Lane" Jovanović (Serbian Cyrillic: Милан Јовановић; born 18 April 1981) is a Serbian former professional footballer who played as a forward or winger.

He began his career with FK Vojvodina and had brief spells at Shakhtar Donetsk and Lokomotiv Moscow before joining Standard Liège, where he was named Belgian Pro League player of the year in 2008 and Belgian Golden Shoe the following year. In 2010–11, he spent the season at Liverpool before returning to Belgium afterwards to spend the rest of his career at Anderlecht.

Jovanović earned 44 caps for the Serbian national team from his debut in 2007, and scored 11 international goals. Coach Radomir Antić created a wing-tandem with Jovanović and Miloš Krasić which is remembered as the best wing-partnership in the modern history of the Serbian national team. He represented Serbia at the 2010 FIFA World Cup. He is commonly referred to by his nickname Lane.

Early life
Son of Stamenko and Gordana, Jovanović was born and raised in Bajina Bašta before moving to Valjevo, Novi Sad, and Belgrade in pursuit of a football career. He played in the youth teams of FK Kosmos Bajina Bašta and FK Budućnost Valjevo.

Club career

Early career
Jovanović came to make his debut with FK Vojvodina during the 1999–2000 season. He then played at Shakhtar Donetsk and Lokomotiv Moscow, before arriving at Standard Liège in 2006.

Standard Liège
At Standard Liège, Jovanović quickly became a fan favourite, scoring 14 goals in his first season and earning the nickname "the snake" for his fast movement. Another two highly successful seasons in Belgium followed, with Jovanović turning down a move to Spanish giants Real Madrid in 2009 because he was worried he would not play regularly. Jovanović was hugely successful in Belgium and on 13 January 2010, was named as the Jupiler League's Player of the Year. However, the year after, Standard Liege ended the season at the 8th position, with Jovanović managing to score 10 goals in his last season in Belgium.

Liverpool
Jovanović joined English Premier League club Liverpool on 8 July 2010 on a free transfer. There had been speculation he would renege on the pre-contract agreement that he had signed after Liverpool manager Rafael Benítez resigned in June 2010: Benítez was reported to be anxious to bring the player to his new club Inter Milan, but Jovanović confirmed his intention to honour his contract, and was given squad number 14.

On 29 July 2010, Jovanović made his competitive debut for Roy Hodgson's Liverpool, starting in a 2–0 away win against FK Rabotnički in the Europa League and made his home debut in the second leg.
He went on to make his Premier League debut on 15 August 2010, against Arsenal in a 1–1 draw at Anfield. He scored his first goal for Liverpool in the League Cup tie against League Two side Northampton Town at Anfield on 22 September. After Kenny Dalglish took over as Liverpool manager in early 2011, Jovanović was rarely called upon, occasionally not even being named to the bench.

Anderlecht
In August 2011, Jovanović moved to Belgian club Anderlecht, signing a two-year contract. On 17 March 2013 Jovanović scored a stunning goal against KAA Gent, where he chested the ball forward before kicking the airborne ball from over 20 meters out into the upper right corner of the goal. In his time at Anderlecht, he scored 23 goals in 69 league games. In the summer of 2013, he did not renew his contract with Anderlecht. He returned to Serbia that summer and trained in Novi Sad, prompting journalists to speculate a Bosman move to FK Vojvodina. However, he did not sign a contract with Vojvodina and remained off the radar of professional football after his departure from Anderlecht.

International career
Jovanović made his debut for the Serbian national team against Finland on 2 June 2007. Serbia won the match 2–0, with Jovanović scoring Serbia's second goal. Jovanović was Serbia's top scorer in 2010 FIFA World Cup qualifying. On 21 May 2010, he was included by coach Radomir Antić in Serbia's initial 23-man squad for the 2010 FIFA World Cup. On 18 June 2010, Jovanović scored his first goal in the FIFA World Cup, against Germany in a Group D match, which Serbia won 1–0. In the same match, Jovanović allegedly had a humorous exchange with Marko Marin, who was born in Bosnia and Herzegovina; Marin admitted that when he substituted Thomas Müller in the 70th minute, Jovanović told him jokingly to "run slower" so as to let Serbia hold on to the 1–0 lead.

In popular culture
In October 2011, Jovanović was mentioned in the Australian soap opera Neighbours, where he was described by Andrew Robinson as "one of the greatest soccer players in the world." Several commentators in the English-speaking football community expressed surprise at this statement.

Personal life
He is married to Nataša and has three children named Lazar, Dušan and Miloš.

Career statistics

Club

International

Scores and results list Serbia's goal tally first, score column indicates score after each Jovanović goal.

Honours
Shakhtar Donetsk
 Ukrainian Cup: 2003–04

Lokomotiv Moscow
 Russian Premier League: 2004

Standard Liège
 Belgian First Division: 2007–08, 2008–09
 Belgian Super Cup: 2008, 2009

Anderlecht
 Belgian Pro League: 2011–12, 2012–13
 Belgian Super Cup: 2012

Individual
 Belgian Footballer of the Year: 2007–08
 Belgian Golden Shoe: 2009

References

External links

 
 LFChistory.net player profile
  
 
 
 Premier League profile
 
 

1981 births
Living people
People from Bajina Bašta
Serbian footballers
Serbia and Montenegro footballers
Association football forwards
Association football wingers
Serbia international footballers
2010 FIFA World Cup players
FK Vojvodina players
FC Shakhtar Donetsk players
FC Shakhtar-2 Donetsk players
FC Lokomotiv Moscow players
Standard Liège players
Liverpool F.C. players
R.S.C. Anderlecht players
Ukrainian Premier League players
Ukrainian First League players
Russian Premier League players
Belgian Pro League players
Premier League players
Serbian expatriate footballers
Serbia and Montenegro expatriate footballers
Serbian people of Bosnia and Herzegovina descent
Expatriate footballers in Ukraine
Serbia and Montenegro expatriate sportspeople in Ukraine
Expatriate footballers in Russia
Expatriate footballers in Belgium
Expatriate footballers in England